Alexander-Martin Sardina (born 15 September 1973;) is a former member of parliament for the Christian Democratic Union of Germany (CDU).

Biography 
Sardina was born and raised in Hamburg, Germany. His father moved from Sicily, Italy, to Germany in the 1960s; his mother is from Hamburg. He received his Staatsexamen from the University of Hamburg in 2002. In 2016, he received a Dr. phil. degree with a dissertation on the history of foreign language teaching in the Soviet occupation zone (SBZ) and East Germany (DDR) from 1945 to 1989.

Sardina works as a lecturer, translator, and consultant, mainly in Berlin, Germany.

Political career 
Sardina joined the Christian Democratic Union of Germany (CDU), in 1994. His first public office was as a member of the board of the ministry of education (Behörde für Schule, Jugend und Berufsbildung) in Hamburg from 1997 to 2002. In 2001, he became a member of the board of the ministry of environment and health (Behörde für Umwelt und Gesundheit). From 2001 to 2004, Sardina was the party secretary (whip) of the CDU parliamentary group in the regional assembly of the district of Hamburg-Mitte. After the 2004 general elections, his party held the majority of seats and thus he became chairman of the regional assembly.

From 2005 to 2008, Sardina was a member of the Hamburg Parliament, the Hamburgische Bürgerschaft. He also served as the spokesman of the CDU fraction for Asian affairs and as a member of the board of directors of the "Asien-Brücke" (literally: Asia bridge), a Senate-run foundation focusing on development aid to Sri Lanka.

References

External links 
 
 Positions and questions answered by Alexander-Martin Sardina (2004–2008) on Parliamentwatch (German language).

1973 births
Living people
People educated at the Sankt-Ansgar-Schule
Christian Democratic Union of Germany politicians
Members of the Hamburg Parliament
20th-century German politicians
21st-century German politicians
Historians of Germany
German political scientists
German educational theorists
University of Hamburg alumni